Mikhaylovka is a rural locality (a settlement) in Boronsky Selsoviet, Suyetsky District, Altai Krai, Russia. The population was 160 as of 2013. There are 3 streets.

Geography 
Mikhaylovka is located 22 km southeast of Verkh-Suyetka (the district's administrative centre) by road. Ukrainsky is the nearest rural locality.

References 

Rural localities in Suyetsky District